The Kappa Alpha Society, founded in 1825, was the progenitor of the modern fraternity system in North America. It is considered to be the oldest national, secret, Greek-letter social fraternity and was the first of the fraternities which would eventually become known as the Union Triad that pioneered the North American system of social fraternities. 

While several fraternities claim to be the oldest, Baird's Manual states that  has maintained a continuous existence since its foundation, making it the oldest undergraduate fraternity that exists today. As of 2022, there are five active chapters in the United States and Canada.

History
In 1823, John Hart Hunter, Isaac W. Jackson, and Thomas Hun, who were students at Union College in Schenectady, New York, established an informal group called The Philosophers.

The Kappa Alpha Society represents the middle link between secret societies, literary societies, and Greek-letter organizations like Phi Beta Kappa. In the words of founding member Arthur Burtis:

KA expanded to Williams College in 1833, with fourteen pledges led by Azariah S. Clark of the class of 1834. Other chapters were established in the 19th century at Hobart College, Princeton College, the University of Virginia, Cornell University, the University of Toronto, Lehigh University, and McGill University. Chapters were established at the University of Pennsylvania, the University of Western Ontario, Wesleyan University, the University of Alberta, the University of Calgary, and Dalhousie University in the 20th century. The Union and Wesleyan chapters were co-educational (male and female members) in the recent past. There are currently no co-educational chapters.

Chapters
Following is a list of the active and inactive chapters of the Kappa Alpha Society. Active groups indicated in bold, inactive groups indicated by italics. Chapters are designated with an abbreviation of the institution's Latin name. This organization is not to be confused with the Kappa Alpha Order, a completely separate national fraternity.

Notes

Notable members 

The Kappa Alpha Society has produced a substantial number of notable members in widely varied fields throughout its nearly 200-year history.

See also
List of social fraternities and sororities

References

Kappa Alpha Society. (1881). A biographical record of the Kappa Alpha Society in Williams College, Williamstown, Mass.: From its foundation to the present time. 1831-1881. New York, NY: S. W. Green's Son.
Kappa Alpha Society. (2002). A directory of Kappa Alpha 2002: 175th anniversary edition. Purchase, NY: Bernard C. Harris Publishing Company.
Tarleton, Robert S. (1993). The Spirit of Kappa Alpha: The oldest Greek-letter social fraternity in prose, poetry and picture. New York, NY: John Hart Hunter Press.
The Executive Council of The Kappa Alpha Society. (1941). Kappa Alpha Record: 1825-1940. Clinton, MA: The Colonial Press.
The Executive Council of The Kappa Alpha Society. (1950). Directory of the Kappa Alpha Society 1950. St. Albans, VT: The North Country Press.
The Executive Council of The Kappa Alpha Society. (1960). Kappa Alpha Record 1825-1960. Utica, NY: Thomas J. Griffiths Sons.
The Executive Council of The Kappa Alpha Society. (1976). Kappa Alpha Record 1825-1976: Sesquicentennial edition. Ithaca, NY: Art Craft Printers.

 
Student organizations established in 1825
International student societies
North American Interfraternity Conference
Union College (New York)
1825 establishments in New York (state)